Breitenbrunn am Neusiedler See is a small wine village in the district of Eisenstadt-Umgebung in the Austrian state of Burgenland.

Population

References

Cities and towns in Eisenstadt-Umgebung District